Brasil is a 1981 album by Brazilian artist João Gilberto, featuring Caetano Veloso, Gilberto Gil and Maria Bethânia. The album was later released along with João Gilberto's 1977 album Amoroso.

Track listing

References 

1981 albums
João Gilberto albums